Otto Peter Leck Fischer (March 26, 1904 – June 17, 1956) was a Danish writer and playwright. He was the brother of the politician Viggo Kampmann. Fischer was a socially conscious writer that portrayed the modern urban man with a sad, gray everyday life. His literary style was cool and matter-of-fact. Fischer was read and appreciated in his day, but he has since been forgotten (except in literary-history circles), perhaps because he was so closely associated with the time in which he lived and which he portrayed. Fischer made a name for himself in many genres: novels, films, and radio drama. He is buried at Mariebjerg Cemetery in Gentofte.

Leck Fischer's plays are held in the theater collection at the Royal Library.

References

External links
 Leck Fischer at Gravsted.dk
 Leck Fischer at Dansk Forfatterleksikon
 
 Leck Fischer at the Danish Film Institute

1904 births
1956 deaths
Danish male novelists
20th-century Danish dramatists and playwrights
Danish male screenwriters
Writers from Copenhagen